Estrellita may refer to:
 Estrellita (film)
 Estrellita (wrestler)
 Estrellita Castro, Spanish singer and actress